John McDonnell  (born 1951) is a British Labour Party politician who has been the Member of Parliament for Hayes and Harlington since 1997.

John McDonnell and variations may also refer to:

Politicians
John Macdonell of Greenfield (1785–1812), Canadian lawyer and politician, aide-de-camp to Isaac Brock
"Spanish" John MacDonell (Revolutionary War loyalist) (1728–1810), United Empire Loyalist and early Canadian settler
John MacDonell (political strategist), past President of the Nova Scotia Progressive Conservative Party in Canada
John MacDonell (Nova Scotia politician) (born 1956), NDP MLA in Nova Scotia
John McDonell (American politician) (1780–1846), member of the Michigan Senate in the first years of Michigan's statehood
John McDonell (Le Prêtre) or Macdonell (1768–1850), known as Le Prêtre, political figure in Upper Canada
John Alexander MacDonell (1854–1912), Canadian politician

Sports
John Macdonell (rugby league), Australian rugby league footballer, see List of Canterbury-Bankstown Bulldogs players
John McDonnell (coach) (1938–2021), track coach for the Arkansas Razorbacks
John McDonnell (footballer) (born 1965), former Irish footballer and football manager
Johnny McDonnell (1885–?), Irish footballer
Johnny McDonnell (Gaelic footballer), player for Dublin
John McDonell (c. 1758–1809), captain in Butler's Rangers and MLA for Glengarry County, Ontario, Canada

Arts and entertainment
John Macdonell, American radio producer and host, see WUWF
John McDonnell (playwright), Irish playwright and journalist
John McDonnell (producer), Irish film producer

Others
John Macdonnell (1821–1902), Irish Dean of Cashel
Sir John Macdonell (judge), (1846–1921), English editor of State trials
John MacDonell (British Army officer) (1899–1944), British colonel
John McDonnell (businessman) (born 1938), chairman and CEO at McDonnell Douglas and Boeing
John McDonnell (trade unionist) (born 1943), former Irish trade union leader
John MacDonnell (surgeon) (1796–1892), Irish surgeon